Richer, or Richers, is a surname, and may refer to:

 Bob Richer (born 1951), ice hockey defenceman, played for the Buffalo Sabres 
 Claude Lavoie Richer, Canadian skier at the 1952 Winter Olympics 
 Edmond Richer, French theologian
 Herbert Richers, film and dubbing producer
 Robert Richers, English politician in the 16th century
 Jean Richer, 17th century French astronomer
 Julian Richer, founded British hi-fi retailers Richer Sounds
 Lyse Richer, Canadian administrator and music teacher
 Robert Richer
 Stéphane Richer (ice hockey defenceman)
 Stéphane Richer (ice hockey forward)
 Jean Richer

It may also refer to:
 Richer, Manitoba
Richerus, monk of St. Remi at Reims
"Richers", a pejorative for rich people (who all happen to be black) in the South Park episode "Here Comes the Neighborhood"